DVN may refer to:
 Da Vinci's Notebook, an a cappella group
 Davenport Municipal Airport (Iowa) (IATA/FAA code)
 Davenport (Stockport) railway station
 Devon Energy, an American oil and gas company (NYSE stock symbol)
 Digitaal Vrouwenlexicon van Nederland, a digital Who's Who of Dutch women